Sophie Mette (13 September 1959) is a French politician of the Democratic Movement (MoDem) who has been a member of the National Assembly since 18 June 2017, representing the department of Gironde.

Political career
Having moved to Bazas commune in 1987, Mette was elected as a councilor for the commune in 2001 with the Miscellaneous right. 

Mette competed in the 2007 French parliamentary election with the Union for French Democracy. For the 2008 municipal elections, she left the right and joined the left, where she would remain as a re-elected as councilor until 2014. In the 2010 regional elections, she joined MoDem, and then joined the En Marche!-MoDem coalition in 2017.

Mette currently holds a position in the Bureau of the Nation Assembly as a secretary, under the leadership of its President Richard Ferrand. She is also a member of the Committee on Cultural Affairs and Education.

References

1959 births
Living people
Deputies of the 15th National Assembly of the French Fifth Republic
Women members of the National Assembly (France)
Democratic Movement (France) politicians
21st-century French women politicians
Deputies of the 16th National Assembly of the French Fifth Republic